Salting the Battlefield is a 2014 British political thriller television film, written and directed for the BBC by the British writer David Hare. It follows Page Eight, which aired on BBC Two in August 2011 and Turks & Caicos, which aired in 2014.

Plot
Following their flight from Turks and Caicos, Johnny Worricker (Bill Nighy) and Margot Tyrell (Helena Bonham Carter) hopscotch around Europe to evade capture by MI5. After spotting one of his former recruits, disguised as a passing jogger, Johnny relocates once again and instructs former colleague Rollo Maverley (Ewen Bremner) to leak news of Prime Minister Alec Beasley's (Ralph Fiennes) corrupt dealings with Stirling Rogers (Rupert Graves) and his Bridge Foundation. Margot secretly keeps in touch with Johnny's pregnant daughter Julianne (Felicity Jones). In London, Acting Director General Jill Tankard (Judy Davis) contacts Deputy Prime Minister Anthea Catcheside (Saskia Reeves) and offers her services in aiding Catcheside's embattled husband.

Johnny and Margot separate on their way back into Britain to confound their pursuers. While Johnny disappears and travels via the English Channel, an errant MI5 agent runs into Margot on a train and alerts his superiors. Rollo aids Margot's escape and delivers her to Reverend Bernard Towers (Malcolm Sinclair), a friend of Johnny's from Cambridge. Johnny contacts Belinda Kay (Olivia Williams), editor-in-chief of The Independent and details the workings of the financial deals surrounding Beasley, Rogers and The Bridge. Kay's publication of the information causes Rogers to resign from the foundation and admit to his misdeeds, despite Beasley's assurances.

Julianne contacts Margot after learning that her boyfriend (Shazad Latif) was an MI5 plant who has bugged her flat. Johnny arranges a meeting with Beasley at 10 Downing Street, demanding he call off the surveillance against his daughter. Beasley reveals that he intends to leave office and assume the title of Consul General to Iran, with American funding and UN cover. Johnny is then summoned to a meeting with Tankard, who reveals that she engineered Beasley's downfall after seeing the extent of the Page Eight, the intelligence that started the scandal. Through her burying of Bill Catcheside's legal troubles, Tankard has Anthea, Beasley's planned successor, in her pocket. Tankard asks Johnny to return to MI5, an offer he reluctantly accepts in return for Julianne and Margot's safety and Maverley's reinstatement into MI5.

Back in Margot's apartment, Johnny sees Margot leaving for Hong Kong to work in a start-up. Margot mentions that Julianne is in labour, accompanied by her mother. The film closes with scenes of Margot leaving, Johnny walking across London to the MI5 headquarters, and Julianne giving birth to her child.

Cast
 Bill Nighy as Johnny Worricker, former MI5 analyst
 Helena Bonham Carter as Margot Tyrrell
 Rupert Graves as Stirling Rogers
 Ralph Fiennes as Alec Beasley MP, Prime Minister
 Ewen Bremner as Rollo Maverley
 James McArdle as Ted Finch
 Judy Davis as Jill Tankard, Acting Director General of MI5
 Felicity Jones as Julianne Worricker
 Valeria Vereau as Elisabeth
 Saskia Reeves as Anthea Catcheside MP, Deputy Prime Minister
 Olivia Williams as Belinda Kay, editor-in-chief of The Independent
 Leanne Best as Amber Page, an MI5 officer pursuing Johnny and Margot
 Pip Carter as Freddy Lagarde
 Daniel Ryan as Bill Catcheside
 Kate Burdette as Allegra Betts
 Shazad Latif as Jez Nichols
 Malcolm Sinclair as Reverend Bernard Towers

References

External links
 
 
 Salting the Battlefield media pack

British spy films
Films directed by David Hare
British political films
2014 in British television
Heyday Films films
2014 television films
2014 films
British crime films
Spy television films
Crime television films
British thriller television films
Action television films
MI5 in fiction
2010s English-language films
2010s British films